OSN Saturn (ОСН Сатурн УФСИН России по г. Москве; Otdel Spetsialnogo Naznacheniya Saturn) is the Moscow department of the Federal Penitentiary Service (FSIN) special purpose unit. Saturn was formed in April 1992 as a part of the Moscow Department of Punishment Execution (UIN) under the Ministry of the Interior. In 2006, the UIN system (including all regional departments and special purpose units) was renamed the Federal Penitentiary Service, and was moved from the jurisdiction of the Ministry of Interior to the Russian Ministry of Justice. The Saturn unit is also often called "Jail Spetsnaz".

Function 

Current duties:

 Preventing crimes in Moscow detention facilities
 Anti-riot actions in detention facilities
 Search and arrest of escaped criminals
 Securing special operations
 Hostage rescue in detention facilities
 Counter-terrorism actions in detention facilities
 Personal security for Ministry of Justice and court officials

Operations 

The Saturn unit participated in the First Chechen War, including the storming of Grozny in December 1994-January 1995, and in the Second Chechen War.

In summer 2000, Saturn officers protected PACE delegates during their visit to the Chechen Republic.

Saturn participated in the hostage rescue operation in Kapotnya investigative isolation ward No.9 in September 2006.

It provided protection and convoy support during both Mikhail Khodorkovsky cases.

Saturn provide illegals program agent protection in Moscow.

Training 

 Airborne training
 Marksmanship
 Hand-to-hand combat and knife fighting
 Psychological warfare
 Weapons handling
 Rappelling
 Anti-riot actions

Equipment

Vehicles 

 KAMAZ 43269 Vistrel
 Ford E-series armored prisoners van
 Armored Volkswagen T5 Transporter TDI
 KAMAZ-43114
 Toyota Land Cruiser 100
 Nissan Patrol GR (Y60)
 VAZ-2131 Niva
 GAZ-2217 Barguzin passenger van

Weapons 

 Glock 17
 Glock 19
 Makarov pistol PMM
 GSh-18
 CZ 75
 AEK-919K “Kashtan”
 9 mm submachine gun PP-91 KEDR
 Carbine assault rifle 9A-91
 9mm submachine gun PP-19 Bizon
 Submachine gun PP-19-01 Vityaz SN
 KS-23M Drozd
 Assault rifle AEK-971 with GP-25
 RPG-7
 AGS-30
 6G-30
 Assault rifle AN-94 Abakan
 Yarygin pistol MP-443 Grach
 AK-74M
 AK-103
 RPK-74
 OSV-96
 SVD
 SVU

See also 

 List of special police units

External links 

 
 Rappelling training photos
 Armored vehicle and weapons photos
 Saturn cars and armored vehicles photos
 Saturn KAMAZ-43269 Vistrel walkaround

Special forces of Russia
Government of Russia
Penal system in Russia